Alla Genrikhovna Masevich (October 9, 1918 — May 6, 2008) was a Soviet astronomer. She graduated from Moscow State Pedagogical University. She served as deputy chairman of the Astronomical Council of the Academy of Sciences of the USSR in 1952, and worked closely with Victor Ambartsumian. She became a professor of space geodesy at the Moscow Institute of Geodesy and Cartography in 1972.

She is known for her work in organizing groups to observe some of the first Russian satellites (1956–57). Masevitch was the Russian delegate to the International Astronautical Federation Congress following the 1957 Sputnik launch and presented a paper on optical tracking of satellites.

Career 
From 1952 to 1987 she held the prestigious position of Deputy Chairman of the Astronomical Council of the Akademiya Nauk Sovestskogo Soyuza.  During her tenure at the Academy, she led a team in 1957 to monitor Soviet satellites which included Sputnik.
in

In 1961 she visited London and, with Sir Patrick Moore, gave a talk at the Royal Festival Hall.

In 1987 she left the Academy to become Chairman of the Astrosoviets, the Astronomical Council of the Academy of Sciences USSR.

Awards and honors 
 Foreign membership into the United Kingdom’s Royal Astronomical Society (1963)
 Galaber Medal of the International Astronautic Federation

Personal life 
Alla Masevich (or Massevitch) was born in Tbilisi as the eldest child of Natalia A. Zhgenti, a Georgian nurse, and Genrikh C. Massevitch, a lawyer. Masevich married Josif N. Friedlander and they had one daughter together, Natasha Josifovna Friedlander.

References

Sources
 Karl Ledersteger, in Astronomische und Physikalische Geodäsie (Erdmessung). Band V von Jordan-Eggert-Kneissl, Handbuch der Vermessungskunde. Verlag J. B. Metzler, Stuttgart 1969, DNB 456892842.
 A.G.Massewitsch (1957): Aufbau und Evolution der Unterriesen
 JPL-Datenbank: Asteroid 1904 Massevitch (1972 JM)

1918 births
2008 deaths
Soviet astronomers
Women astronomers
Members of the German Academy of Sciences at Berlin